George Street is a street in central Oxford, England. It is a shopping street running east–west.

Overview

Its eastern end meets Broad Street at a crossroads with Cornmarket Street to the south and Magdalen Street to the north. Its western end meets Hythe Bridge Street at a crossroads with Worcester Street.

The New Theatre Oxford, Oxford's main commercial theatre, is on the north side of the street. For a period, it was the Apollo Theatre but it has regained its earlier name. The Burton Taylor Studio is in Gloucester Street, which runs off the north side of George Street. Number 40 on the north side is the OFS Studio.

Gloucester Green bus station is off the north of George Street at the western end. Companies including the Oxford Bus Company and Stagecoach in Oxfordshire operate services from here.

History
George Street is outside the formerly walled section of Oxford, running parallel with the medieval wall. Buildings on the south side of the street occupy plots that were formerly part of the defensive ditch outside the wall.

The former City of Oxford High School for Boys building on the south side of the street was designed by T. G. Jackson and built in 1880-81. In 1966, the school moved to the Southfields Grammar School site and its former building became the University of Oxford Classics Department. Since 2007, the building has housed the University's Faculty of History.

W.F. Lucas' ready-to-wear clothing factory on the south side of the street was designed by Harry Drinkwater and built by local contractor T. H. Kingerlee in 1892. As a factory, 300 employees worked on the site. It is now divided into multiple retail and office premises.

The brick buildings of the former fire station and Corn Exchange on the north side of the street were designed by H.W. Moore and built in 1894. By 1974, the fire station had moved to Rewley Road and its former building had been converted to a community arts centre (The Old Fire Station Arts Centre) run by the charity Oxford Area Arts Council and used occasionally by Anvil Productions, the Oxford Playhouse Company, for rehearsals. It has since been the Old Fire Station Theatre and is now the OFS Studio.

The present New Theatre was built in 1933. It is the third New Theatre on the site, replacing successive buildings completed in 1836 and 1886.

The Ritz Cinema on the north side of George Street was built in 1936. Since then it has changed owners and names a number of times. It is now the Odeon George Street.

References

Sources

Streets in Oxford
Shopping streets in Oxford